The 1999–2000 Iowa Hawkeyes men's basketball team represented the University of Iowa as members of the Big Ten Conference during the 1999–2000 NCAA Division I men's basketball season. The team was led by first-year head coach Steve Alford and played their home games at Carver–Hawkeye Arena. They finished the season 14–16 overall and 6–10 in Big Ten play.

Roster

Schedule/Results

|-
!colspan=8| Non-Conference Regular Season
|-

|-
!colspan=8| Big Ten Regular Season
|-

|-
!colspan=8| Big Ten tournament

Rankings

References

Iowa Hawkeyes men's basketball seasons
Iowa
1999 in sports in Iowa
2000 in sports in Iowa